Henry and Elizabeth Ernst House is a historic home located at Washington, Franklin County, Missouri. It was built about 1874, and is a -story, five bay, central passage plan brick dwelling on a brick foundation.  It has a side-gable roof and low segmental arched door and window openings.  It features a front porch and a prominent front gable, which is sheathed with fishscale shingles, was probably added in 1892 when the house was rebuilt after a fire.

It was listed on the National Register of Historic Places in 2000.

References

Houses on the National Register of Historic Places in Missouri
Houses completed in 1874
Buildings and structures in Franklin County, Missouri
National Register of Historic Places in Franklin County, Missouri